The Love Bunglers is a graphic novel by American cartoonist Jaime Hernandez, published in 2014.  The story focuses on the character Maggie, the protagonist of Hernandez's Locas stories, and two men with whom she has been involved with in the past, Ray Dominguez and Reno Banks.

References

Works cited

Further reading

 
 
 

2014 graphic novels
American graphic novels
Jaime Hernandez
Fantagraphics titles